The State of the Coast is a website launched by the National Oceanic and Atmospheric Administration (NOAA) in March 2010.  The site contains quick facts and detailed statistics offered on communities, economy, ecology, and climate.  The website aims to communicate and highlight the connections among a healthy coastal ecosystem, a robust U.S. economy, a safe population, and a sustainable quality of life for coastal residents.

The Web site is periodic, and is updated on a monthly basis.

Communities Topics
The U.S. Population Living in Coastal Counties

Swimming at Our Nation's Beaches

Marine Protected Areas: Conserving our Nation's Marine Resources

Economy Topics
The Coast - Our Nation's Economic Engine

Recreational Fishing - An American Pastime

Commercial Fishing - A Cultural Tradition

Ports - Crucial Coastal Infrastructure

Response Topics
The Overall Health of Our Nation's Coastal Waters

Invasive Species Disrupt Coastal Ecosystems and Economies

Coral Reef Ecosystems - Critical Coastal Habitat

Nutrient Pollution and Hypoxia - Everything is Upstream of the Coast

Climate Topics
Vulnerability of Our Nation's Coasts to Sea Level Rise

U.S. Population in the 100-year Coastal Flood Hazard Area

Federally-Insured Assets along the Coast

External links
 NOAA's State of the Coast Web Site
 Retired NOS State of the Coast Web Site
 National Oceanic and Atmospheric Administration
 NOAA

National Oceanic and Atmospheric Administration